Dalriada is a folk metal band from Sopron, Hungary that was formed in 1998 as Echo of Dalriada, but shortened their name to Dalriada in late 2006. Their third studio album Kikelet and all subsequent albums were successful in the top ten of the official Mahasz music charts. Their Arany-album won the 2009 HangSúly Hungarian Metal Awards out of 70 contestants. In 2012, the band toured through Europe with Arkona and Darkest Era.

Album titles 
The titles of their albums are supposed to be ancient Hungarian names of months (which are not used today). In fact they originate from the folk-history work "" by Hungarian writer Zoltán Paál and are not based on any scientific evidence. Specifically, "Fergeteg" is, according to Paál, the ancient name of January, "Jégbontó" is February, "Kikelet" is March, "Szelek" is April, "Ígéret" is May, "Napisten" is June, "Áldás" is July, "Új Kenyér" is August, "Őszelő" is September, "Magvető" is October, "Enyészet" is November, and "Álom" is December.  Arany-Album and Forrás are exceptions, the former contains the poems of János Arany, a Hungarian poet from the 19th century, and the latter - which is an acoustic album - translates as "Source", or "Spring".

The band attempted to compete in Eurovision, but since their music contains traditional folk tunes, they could not qualify to enter.

Discography

Music videos

Members 
Current line-up
 Laura Binder – vocals (2001–present)
 András Ficzek – vocals (1998–present), guitars (2000–present)
 Mátyás Németh-Szabó – guitar (2006–present)
 Gergely Szabó "Szög" - keyboards, backing vocals (2014–present)
 István Molnár – bass (2008–present)
 Ádám Monostori - drums (2018–present)

Session musicians
 Attila Fajkusz – violin, tambourine, backing vocals (2007, 2009–present)
 Ernő Szőke – doublebass (2009–present)
 Gergely Szőke – viola, lute, acoustic guitars (2009–present)

Former and past members
 Péter Hende – guitars (1998 – 2001†)
 Marcell Fispán – guitars (1998–2005)
 Tadeusz Rieckmann - drums (2001-2018)
 György Varga – bass, harsh vocals (2002–2008)
 Gergely Nagy – keyboards (2003–2006)
 András Kurz – keyboards (2006–2009)
 Barnabás Ungár – keyboards, backing vocals, harsh vocals (2009–2014)
 Ádám Csete – bagpipe, flutes, backing vocals (2012–2019)

Timeline

References

External links 

 
 Official Dalriada Profile at Myspace

Folk metal musical groups
Hungarian heavy metal musical groups
Musical groups established in 1998